Mostafalu (also Romanized as Moşţafálū and Mostafa Loo; also known as Mustāfiu) is a village in Shivanat Rural District, Afshar District, Khodabandeh County, Zanjan Province, Iran. At the 2006 census, its population was 143, in 30 families.

References 

Populated places in Khodabandeh County